The 2020–21 season is Barrow's 119th year in existence and their first season in League Two having gained promotion from the National League in 2020 ending a 48 year exile from the Football League. Along with League Two, the club will also participate in the FA Cup, EFL Cup and EFL Trophy.

The season covers the period from 1 July 2020 to 30 June 2021.

Transfers

Transfers in

Loans in

Loans out

Transfers out

Pre-season

Competitions

League Two

League table

Results summary

Results by matchday

Matches

The 2020–21 season fixtures were released on 21 August.

FA Cup

The draw for the first round was made on Monday 26, October.

EFL Cup

The first round draw was made on 18 August, live on Sky Sports, by Paul Merson.

EFL Trophy

The regional group stage draw was confirmed on 18 August.

Statistics

Appearances and goals

Last updated 10 May 2021.

|-
! colspan=14 style=background:#dcdcdc; text-align:center| Goalkeepers

|-

! colspan=14 style=background:#dcdcdc; text-align:center| Defenders

|-

! colspan=14 style=background:#dcdcdc; text-align:center| Midfielders

|-

! colspan=14 style=background:#dcdcdc; text-align:center| Forwards

|}

Top scorers
Includes all competitive matches. The list is sorted by squad number when total goals are equal.

Last updated 10 May 2021.

Cleansheets
Includes all competitive matches. The list is sorted by squad number when total cleansheets are equal.

Last updated 10 May 2021.

Disciplinary record
Includes all competitive matches.

Last updated 10 May 2021.

References

Barrow A.F.C. seasons
Barrow